Mount Geduhn is located in the Livingston Range, Glacier National Park in the U.S. state of Montana. The mountain is named for Frank Geduhn, an early pioneer who had cabins for visitors at the head of Lake McDonald prior to 1900, and who guided Sperry parties on some of their trips into the area.

Climate
Based on the Köppen climate classification, it is located in an alpine subarctic climate zone characterized by long, usually very cold winters, and short, cool to mild summers. Temperatures can drop below −10 °F with wind chill factors below −30 °F.

See also
 List of mountains and mountain ranges of Glacier National Park (U.S.)

References

Livingston Range
Mountains of Flathead County, Montana
Mountains of Glacier National Park (U.S.)
Mountains of Montana

External links
 Frank Geduhn photo: Billingsgazette.com